Angle Lake is an L-shaped lake in SeaTac, Washington, United States, occupying  between Interstate 5 and State Route 99. The lake most likely was so named on account of its outline. On the western shore is a  park, Angle Lake Park, administered by the City of SeaTac Parks and Recreation department.  The remainder of the shoreline is ringed with private homes.

The lake is stocked with rainbow trout by the Washington Department of Fish and Wildlife. It is also home to kokanee, largemouth bass, crappie, catfish, and yellow perch. The lake is open to fishing year-round.

The Angle Lake light rail station is named for the lake, and is located to the southwest.

Park
Angle Lake Park was established in the 1920s.  The entrance to the park is off International Boulevard (Highway 99),  from Seattle-Tacoma International Airport.  It includes  of the lake shore, with a swimming area, fishing pier, picnic areas and public boat launch.

References

Lakes of King County, Washington
Lakes of Washington (state)
Parks in King County, Washington
SeaTac, Washington